Itay El Barud is a city in Egypt.

History
Itay El Barud was mentioned by Amelino, Ibn Matti and Al-Zubaidi, and Ibn al-Jiyan mentioned it in the ninth century AH with the name (Atiyeh and its miniature), and its name is Coptic (Eiti) and it turned into (Aitiyeh). Then it emerged in the history of the year 1228 in the name of (Itay El-Baroud) and became Delingat markaz in 1884, then it was named the Itai El-Baroud markaz in 1896.

Geography

Itay El-Baroud is located on the agricultural road between Cairo and Alexandria, north of Kafr El Zayat and south of Damanhour, and is 140 km away from Cairo and 84 km from Alexandria.

Population

Itai's population reached 44,856, of whom 21,991 were male and 22,865 were female, according to the 2006 official census.

References

Cities in Egypt